The Little Salkeld rail accident occurred on 19 January 1918 in Long Meg cutting, between Little Salkeld and Lazonby railway stations (about 15 miles south of Carlisle on the Settle-Carlisle Line).

As the 11 carriage 08:50 London St Pancras to Glasgow St Enoch express approached the cutting, a heavy landslip caused by a sudden thaw blocked both tracks ahead of the train. Just five minutes earlier a platelayer had walked past the spot and seen nothing amiss.  The engine, a Midland Railway 1000 Class No. 1010, ploughed into the mass of clay at a speed of 50–60 mph, telescoping the front two carriages.

6 passengers were killed immediately and another fatally injured, whilst 37 passengers and 9 railway staff received non-fatal injuries. The more seriously injured were taken either to the Cumberland Infirmary or Fusehill Military Hospital, both in Carlisle.

References

External links
Official report

Railway accidents and incidents in Cumbria
Railway accidents in 1918
1918 disasters in the United Kingdom
1918 in England
History of Cumbria
20th century in Cumbria
Accidents and incidents involving Midland Railway
January 1918 events
Hunsonby